Martin Klimas (born 1971) is a German photographer.

Biography
Klimas obtained his degree in Visual Communications from Fachhochschule Dusseldorf. He has had a number of exhibitions in Germany and abroad. Kilmas has a new series called ‘Exploding Vegetables,' which is created by "firing a projectile into different kinds of fruits and vegetables reflecting our shift towards healthy food and away from junk food."

Represented by
Galerie Cosar
Foley Gallery in New York City

References

External links
 

Photographers from Baden-Württemberg
Living people
1971 births
People from Konstanz (district)